There has been numerous works of art that depicted the Bangladesh Liberation War during and since the War both at Bangladesh and abroad. The concert for Bangladesh organized by members of the Beatles was a major happening in 1971 for protest music. The songs recorded for and broadcast on Swadhin Bangla Betar Kendra are still considered to be the best of Bangladeshi protest songs.

The four documentaries made during the War – Zahir Raihan's Stop Genocide and A State Is Born, Babul Chowdhry's Innocent Millions, Alamgir Kabir's Liberation Fighters – are described as the first films made in Bangladesh, as earlier films were all made in Pakistan or India, larger entities that Bangladesh belonged to. Muktir Gaan (Song of Freedom), based on footage shot by Leer Levin during the war, by Tareque and Kathrine Masud is critically the most acclaimed Bangladeshi documentary. The directors followed the film with two sequels – Story of Freedom and Narir Katha. Their feature film on the same subject, Matir Moyna, won the FIPRESCII award at Cannes Film Festival.

There have been numerous poems and novels written on the Liberation war, including Shamsur Rahman's famous poems written during the War. Arguably it is the most often used subject for Bangladeshi literature since 1971. The monuments made to commemorate the War are the highest esteemed monuments in Bangladesh.

Films
 Stop Genocide – documentary by Zahir Raihan (1971)
 Let There be Light by Zahir Raihan (1971)
 Nine Months to Freedom: The Story of Bangladesh – documentary by S. Sukhdev (1972)
 Ora Egaro Jon (The Magnificent Eleven) by Chashi Nazrul Islam (1972)
 Arunodoyer Agnishakkhi (The Dawn Observer) by Subhash Dutta (1972)
 Bagha Bangali (The Bengal Tiger) by Ananda (1972)
 Raktakto Bangla (The Blood-stained Bengal) by Mamtaj Ali (1972)
 Dhire Bohe Meghna (Quiet Flows the river Meghna) by Alamgir Kabir (1973)
 Amar Jonmovumi (1973)
 Sangram (The War) by Chashi Nazrul Islam (1974)
 Abar Tora Manush Ho (Be Human Again) by Khan Ataur Rahman (1973)
 Alor Michhil (1974)
 Sangram (1974)
 Megher Onek Rong (Clouds Have Many Colors) by Harun-Or-Rashid (1976)
 Kalmilata  by Shahidul Haq Khan (1981)
 Chitkar (1982)
 Agami (Toward) by Morshedul Islam (1984)
 Hooliya (Wanted) by Tanvir Mokammel (1984), based on Nirmalendu Goon's Hulia poem
 Protyaborton (1986)
 Suchona by Morshedul Islam (1988)
 Charpotro (1988)
 Bokhate (1989)
 Duronto (1989)
 Potaka (1989)
 Kalo Chil '71 (1990)
 Dushor Jatra (1992)
 Ekattorer Jishu (Jesus '71) – feature film by Nasiruddin Yousuff, based on Shahriar Kabir's story (1993)
 Desh Premik (1994)
 Muktir Gaan (Song of Freedom, 1995), Muktir Kotha (A Tale of Freedom, 1999), and Narir Katha – three different Bengali-language documentaries by Tareque Masud and Catherine Masud
 Aguner Poroshmoni feature film by Humayun Ahmed (1994)
 Nodir Naam Modhumoti (The River Called Madhumoti) by Tanvir Mokammel (1995)
 Ekhono Onek Raat (1997)
 Hangor Nodi Grenade, On the basis of Selina Hossain's novel, Chashi Nazrul Islam (1997)
 Gourob (1998)
 Chana O Muktijuddo (1998)
 Ekattorer Lash (1998)
 Itihas Kanna by Shamim AKter, Biography of a war child (1999)
 Shovoner Ekattor (2000)
 Muktijoddo O Jibon (2000)
 Shei Rater Kotha Bolte Eshechi ("I Have Come to Speak of That Night") – documentary by Kawsar Chowdhury (2001)
 Ekjon Muktijodda (2001)
 Ekattorer Michil by Kabori Sarwar (2001)
 Ekattorer Rong Pencil by Manan Hira  (2001)
 Matir Moina (The Clay Bird) by Tareque Masud (2002), winner of the FIPRESCI Prize at the 2002 Cannes Film Festival
 Shilalipi by Shamim Akhter (2002)
 Hridoyghata (2002)
 Spartacus '71
 Shorot '71 by Morshedul Islam (2002)
 Swadhinata (Freedom) by Yasmine Kabir (2003)
 Ami Sadhinota Enechhi by Sagar Lohani (2003)
 Amar Bandhu Rashed (My Friend Rashed) by Morshedul Islam (2004)
 Shyamol Chhaya feature film by Humayun Ahmed (2004)
 Joyjatra feature film by Tauquir Ahmed (2004)
 Megher Pore Megh by Chashi Nazrul Islam (2004)
 Dhrubotara (2006)
 Khelagor by Morshedul Islam, (2006)
 Asttitey Amar Desh, According to the Biography of Matiur Rahman directed by Khijir Hayat Khan (2007)
 Tajuddin Ahmed: Nishongo Sarati (Tajuddin Ahmad: An Unsung Hero) by Tanvir Mokammel (2007)
 Rabeya by Tanvir Mokammel, (2009)
 Meherjaan by Rubaiyat Hossain (2011)
 Guerrilla by Nasiruddin Yousuff (2011)
 Khondo Golpo '71 (2011)
 Amar Bondhu Rashed by Morshedul Islam (2011) based on a juvenile novel by Muhammed Zafar Iqbal
 Pita - The Father by Masud Akando (2012)
 The War Crimes File by David Bergman (Three men's role in Bangladesh war genocide) (2013)
 Dateline Bangladesh by Gita Mehta (2013)
 Nekabborer Mohaproyan directed by Masud Pathik, based on a poetry by Nirmalendu Goon (2014)
 Shongram (2014)
 Children of War (2014) Indian Hindi film based on Bangladesh Liberation war
 Bishkanta (The Poison Thorn) by Farjana Boby (2015)
 Meghmollar by Zahidur Rahim Anjan (2015), adapted from a story by Akhtaruzzaman Ilias
 Anil Bagchir Ekdin (Anil Bagchi’s Day) by Morshedul Islam (2015), adapted from Humayun Ahmed’s novel
 Angels of Hell by Shameem Shahid (2015); Short film based on war children of Bangladesh Liberation War
 Janmasathi (Born Together) by Shabnam Ferdousi (2017)
 Bhuban Majhi by Fakhrul Arefeen Khan (2017)
 Romeo Akbar Walter, Indian movie based on the life of Agent Ravindra Kaushik

Plays
 Payer Awaj Pawa jay by Syed Shamsul Haque (1976)
 Juddho Ebong Juddho by Syed Shamsul Haque (1986)
 Joyjoyonti by Mamunur Rashid (1995)
 Ekattorer Pala by Nasiruddin Yousuff Bacchu (1993)
 Mukhosh
 Kingsukh
 Je Merute
 Bibisab by Abdullah al Mamun (1994)
 Kotha '71
 Bolod by Muhammed Zafar Iqbal

Literature
 Ami Birangana Bolchi (The Voices of War Heroines) – first-person narratives collected by Nilima Ibrahim (two volumes: 1994, 1995)
 Ekatture Uttar Ronangaon ('71 Northern Front) – Factual War Accounts (in Bengali) by Muhammad Hamidullah Khan, Sector Commander 11, War of Independence – Bangladesh
 Amar Bondhu Rashed (My Friend Rashed) - Juvenile novel by Muhammed Zafar Iqbal
 Ghum Nei (Sleepless Nights) – memoir by Nasiruddin Yusuf
 Ami Bijoy Dekhechi (I have witnessed the Victory) – memoir by M. R. Akhtar Mukul
 A Tale of Millions – memoir by Major (R) Rafik Ul Islam
 Ekattorer Dinguli (Days of 71) – memoir by Jahanara Imam (1986) 
 Maa(The Mother) – novel by Anisul Hoque (2003) 
 Jochhna o Janani'r Galpo (The Tale of Moonlight and the Motherland) – novel by Humayun Ahmed (2004) 
 Of Blood and Fire –
 September on Jessore Road – poem by Allen Ginsberg
 A Golden Age – novel by Tahmima Anam
 Aguner Poroshmoni - novel by Humayun Ahmed
 1971 - novel by Humayun Ahmed
 Of Martyrs and Marigolds - a novel written by a Stranded Pakistani woman, Aquila Ismail.

Music
 The Concert for Bangladesh, New York, 1971
 Song for Bangladesh – song by Joan Baez
 Bangla Desh – song by George Harrison

Sculpture and Architecture
 Sucker'wfp21 war project created by artist Firoz Mahmud which first exhibited at Aichi Triennial 2010 in Nagoya, Japan and other venues and cities including University Art Museum Tokyo and collaborating with Liberation War Museum and EMK Center in Dhaka.
 Jatiyo Smriti Soudho (National Monument for Remembrance) in Savar, Dhaka
 Swadhinata Stambha (Independence Monument) in Suhrawardy Udyan, Dhaka
 Aparajeyo Bangla (Invincible Bengal) – sculpture in Dhaka University
 Shabash Bangladesh (Bravo, Bangladesh) – sculpture in Rajshahi University
 Shoparjito Shadhinota (Self Achieved Freedom) – sculpture in Dhaka University
 Joy Bangla (Hail Bengal) - sculpture in Chittagong University
 Juddho Joy - sculpture in Alekhar Char, Cumilla
 Shadhinota Smriti Mural (Independence Memorial Mural) - mural in Chittagong University

Museums
 Liberation War Museum, Dhaka
 Shahid Smriti Sangrohoshala (Martyr Memorial Museum), Rajshahi

Digital Archive
 Muktijuddho e-Archive

Videogames
 Amar Ei Desh
 Arunodoyer Agnishikha
 Heroes of 71
 Sector 71

See also 
 Artistic depictions of the Bengali Language Movement

References

Aftermath of the Bangladesh Liberation War
Arts in Bangladesh